Joaquim Silva (born January 13, 1961) is a retired long-distance runner from Portugal, who won the 1994 edition of the Vienna Marathon. He represented his native country in the men's marathon at the 1988 Summer Olympics in Seoul, South Korea, finishing in 27th place (2:18:05).

Achievements

References
1994 Marathon Year Ranking

1961 births
Living people
Portuguese male long-distance runners
Athletes (track and field) at the 1988 Summer Olympics
Olympic athletes of Portugal
Place of birth missing (living people)
Portuguese male marathon runners